Somerset Cricket Club Trojans is a Bermudian football club based in Somerset that competes in the Bermudian Premier Division.

History
Trojans were formed in 1964 after a merger between West End Rovers and 2nd division Somerset Colts. Rovers were founded as West End SC in the 1930s. They are Bermuda's most successful team, winning the league a record 10 times.

In April 2015, Trojans won their first league title in 22 years and their tenth in total after beating Southampton Rangers 3–0.

Achievements
Bermudian Premier Division: 10
 1966–67, 1967–68, 1968–69, 1969–70, 1981–82, 1982–83, 1983–84, 1986–87, 1992–93, 2014-15

Bermuda FA Cup: 9
 1967–68, 1968–69, 1969–70, 1971–72, 1975–76, 1976–77, 1978–79, 1987–88, 1989–90

Players

Current squad
 For 2015–2016 season

References

Football clubs in Bermuda
Sandys Parish